Adel Namane (born 14 June 1987) is an Algerian footballer who plays for ASM Oran as a defender.

References

External links

1987 births
Living people
Association football defenders
Algerian footballers
ASM Oran players
MC El Eulma players
21st-century Algerian people